Dhanraj Singh  was an Indian politician. He was elected to the Lok Sabha, the lower house of the Parliament of India from  Munger in Bihar as a member of the Janata Dal.

References

External links
 Official biographical sketch in Parliament of India website

Lok Sabha members from Bihar
Janata Dal politicians
India MPs 1989–1991
1944 births
Living people